Gilan's codes are 46, 56 and 76. In public cars, taxis, and governmental cars the letter is always the same. But in private cars this letter (ب) depends on the city.

46
46 is Rasht county's code and all of the letters are for Rasht.

56

76

Road transport in Iran
Transportation in Gilan Province